The Society of Air Transportation Aero SA was a Polish airline founded in Poznań in February 1925 by the members of the Association of Polish Pilots and based entirely on the Polish seed capital. It operated on December 28, 1928 and on December 29, 1928 it was merged with its main competitor Aerolot to form the newly founded Polish flag carrier LOT Polish Airlines.

Defunct airlines of Poland
LOT Polish Airlines
Airlines established in 1925
Airlines disestablished in 1928